Andrew Wallace Bothwell (7 October 1900 – 4 February 1928) was an Irish footballer who played for Cregagh, Mountpottinger, Willowfield, Bangor and Ards, as well as the Irish national team, as an outside right.

References

1900 births
1928 deaths
Pre-1950 IFA international footballers
Willowfield F.C. players
Bangor F.C. players
Ards F.C. players
Association football outside forwards
Irish association footballers (before 1923)